On 29 September 2008 three bombs exploded in the states of Gujarat and Maharashtra of India killing 10 people and injuring 80. Two bombs went off in Malegaon, Maharashtra, which killed nine people while another blast in Modasa, Gujarat resulted in the death of one person.

Background
India witnessed a surge in terror attacks since May 2008, when a series of blasts in Jaipur killed 63. Since then, other major Indian cities including Bangalore, Ahmedabad and Delhi were targeted.

On 29 September 2008, police in Ahmedabad, Gujarat foiled another terror attack when 17 bombs were found and defused. However, a bomb exploded at a market packed with Muslims breaking their Ramadan fast, killing one and wounding 15. Another bomb placed near a Temple in Faridabad was found and defused. Furthermore, the bombs were purportedly similar to those that exploded in Delhi two days before this attack.

The explosions in Malegaon and Modasa took place on the eve of Navratri, a major Hindu festival celebrated across India.

Blast
The Malegoan blast occurred near a hotel at Bhikku Chowk in Maharashtra. The bombs were allegedly fitted onto a Hero Honda motorcycle and rigged to detonate. 

There had been confusion earlier about what had caused the blast with some suggesting that it was caused by an accidental explosion of a gas cylinder.

The Modasa blasts, resulting in the death of a 15-year-old boy, as well as several others injured, was a result of a bomb kept on a motorcycle that went off near a mosque at the Muslim-dominated Sukka Bazaar. The incident took place around 21:26 when special Ramzan prayers (tarawih) were being offered inside the mosque.

Aftermath
IBN reported that after the blast a mob of 20,000 gathered near the blast site, following which the state of Maharashtra deployed Reserve Police Force to prevent any mob violence. The police brought the situation under control after a brief clash with the mob.

Amidst rising security concerns, Gujarat plans to deploy police in heavy numbers during the garba festivities.

Investigation
Mumbai Police deployed Anti Terrorism Squad to assist the local investigating authorities in Malegaon. Police say that unsophisticated, crude bombs, identical to those that detonated in Delhi 3 days before, were used. The investigation was led by Mumbai Anti Terrorism Squad chief Hemant Karkare, who was later martyred in the 2008 Mumbai Attacks.

Police across India, especially in Delhi, received a number of hoax calls and SMSes, hampering the investigation.

On 5 October police said they had arrested a man in connection to the bombings. Press Trust of India reported that further investigations were under way, with more arrests expected.

Malegaon blasts 
During investigation in Maharashtra, alleged evidence was made ascertaining the involvement of a Hindu group or groups in the blasts . The three arrested were identified as Sadhvi Pragya Singh Thakur, Shiv Narayan Gopal Singh Kalsanghra and Shyam Bhawarlal Sahu. All three were produced before the Nashik Chief Judicial Magistrate's court, which had remanded them to police custody till 3 November. This follows from an earlier claim by the Maharashtra ATS that Hindu groups were behind the blasts. The ATS added that this group could also be behind the blast in Modasa, Gujarat.

Adding to this suspicion, the name of the Akhil Bharatiya Vidyarthi Parishad (ABVP) came up during investigations after a bike was found near the blasts' site in Malegaon, though there was no mention of the organization's involvement in the issue. However, the bike belonged to Pragya Singh Thakur, who had been an ABVP activist in 1997. before she took to a spiritual quest. Sunil Bansal, regional organising secretary of the ABVP, said: "First ATS mentioned the possibility of Vidyarthi Parishad and VHP being involved in the blasts and then the matter was also raised in Rajya Sabha by a Congress MP. But ABVP is in no way involved in the blasts. ABVP has even demanded that there should be a proper inquiry and ATS should come out with evidence and not talk without any basis. They don't have any proof against any ABVP activist." After the arrest of three Hindus, a Hindu group, Sri Ram Sena (SRS), offered legal assistance to the accused . The SRS said the three accused were being made "political victims" by the Congress to hide its own inadequacies . General secretary Binay Singh said: "The Maharashtra government is raking up the Malegaon blast issue to divert attention from the hooliganism of Raj Thackeray while in the Centre the government is looking for an issue to cover up the Batla House encounter incident."

On 25 October, two more persons, suspected ex-army personnel, were also questioned in Pune in connection with the Malegaon blast Mumbai.

Two days later, the total arrest count mounted to seven when the ATS took in Sameer Kulkarni from Bhopal and Sangram Singh from Indore for questioning. According to the ATS, these arrests brought to light the workings of two groups, Rashtriya Jagran Manch and Abhinav Bharat, the latter of which the latest arrests are said to be office bearers.

The director-general of Madhya Pradesh police had confirmed that Kulkarni was picked up by Maharashtra ATS for questioning from Indore. A Maharashtra police office said that the "Investigations have revealed that Kulkarni is the planner of the Malegaon blast." Having moved to Indore four years ago, he was said to be in touch with a colonel and a major—both retired. The officer added "He had sought their help on the use of explosives and its procurement. The two retired army men would be arrested and charged with criminal conspiracy." Accordingly, he was said to have hatched the blast in conspiracy with the sadhvi and two others, who were arrested in connection with the blast. The Additional Commissioner (ATS), Sukhwinder Singh, said Sameer Kulkarni and Major (retd) Ramesh Upadhyay were part of an alleged "larger conspiracy", without elaborating what the conspiracy, or the basis for it, was. A serving lieutenant colonel in the army also came under the scanner for his alleged role in the blasts. It was reported that the army had allowed police to go ahead and question him. On 31 October, more revelations were made as ATS sources said the interrogation of Kulkarni revealed a Bangladeshi link to the terror strike. Kulkarni was believed to have said at least 15 to 20 Bangladeshi nationals were part of Abhinav Bharat . He has also revealed that the Bangladeshi members were also present in a number of meetings held to hatch the plot, which was planned as retaliation for the Ahmedabad blasts in July 2008. Kulkarni was believed to have started a new social organisation called Abhinav Bharat Sansthan.

On 28 October, the Shiv Sena, in Saamna, came out in support of the accused, saying the arrests were merely political in nature. Lending credence to this, party chief Uddhav Thackeray pointed out a potential conflict interest in political rivalry as the Nationalist Congress Party (NCP) controlled the relevant ministry. His editorial also condemned an attack by NCP party workers on a Vishwa Hindu Parishad (VHP) office in Nashik following the arrest of the sadhvi. Allegations arose that the sadhvi was framed for the blast. The firebrand leader of the Bhartiya Janshakti Party, Uma Bharti, had expressed shock that the BJP and the broader sangh parivar grouping were "disowning" the sadhvi, who is alleged to be linked with the Hindu Jagaran Manch. As the politicised wrangling developed, the Hindu Mahasabha decided to provide legal aid to the suspects from Pune – Upadhyay and Kulkarni – while the umbrella organisation, Abhinav Bharat, of which the two are members. The national president of the Mahasabha, Himani Savarkar, also based in Pune, confirmed this. This comes following a refusal but the two to hire lawyers when produced before the Nashik court. The broader organisation of Hindutva groups were seen to come together when the BJP supported the Shiv Sena's move of extending legal aid to the suspects. The BJP said there was nothing wrong in using "private funds" for "helping" someone. Party spokesperson Prakash Javadekar said: "We have no objection to Shiv Sena's announcement of extending legal aid to Malegaon blast suspects. For that matter, even RSS has promised help. It is not wrong for private funds to be utilised for helping someone. It is everyone's right." He added that the party's stand is the same from day one, no one should be discriminated on the basis of religion, caste or sex. The politicking behind the investigation picked up as the probe spread to Uttar Pradesh. The ATS claimed a "high profile leader" from the area may be involved in financing the attack. To this end, BJP MP from Gorakhpur, Yogi Adityanath, dared the Mumbai ATS to accuse him of being the said leader. The ATS then filed an application in a Mumbai court seeking permission to interrogate the hitherto unnamed person, as well as to obtain the co-operation of the UP government in doing so. The UP ATS, however, denied that its Mumbai counterpart had asked for any assistance in netting the alleged accused. UP CM Mayawati convened a high-level meeting of her government to discuss the matter. As yet there was mere speculation that the leader may be Adityanath, or his close associate and BJP MLA from the same town, Radha Mohan Das Agrawal. BJP leader Venkaiah Naidu then said the Maharashtra ATS should speak publicly about the blasts case only when the investigations were complete. He also accused the Congress, as the blame game continued, in saying that it was Congress that gave rise to Bhindranwale in Punjab and supported ULFA in Assam. On the same day, the BJP parliamentary leader, L. K. Advani, also accused the ATS of acting in a politically motivated and unprofessional manner as he alleged that "It has become clear that the ATS is acting in a motivated and unprofessional manner. After going through her (Thakur) affidavit.I have to express my shock and outrage, which I am sure all Indians will share. In view of the shocking charges made against the ATS by the Sadhvi (sic) and the fact that the present investigating team has lost all moral authority, I demand a change in the present ATS team and a judicial inquiry be ordered to probe the charges made by Sadhvi Pragya and the manner in which unsubstantiated allegations have been made against army personnel. After going through her affidavit detailing how she was physically and psychologically tortured and abused in obscene languages by her interrogators, I have to express my shock and outrage. I cannot believe that such barbaric treatment has been meted out to a spiritual person, that too, a woman in a country that prides itself on its democracy and rule of law." A Shiv Sena activist then filed a PIL in the Bombay High Court, to see the investigation handed over to the Maharashtra CID, and to see action taken against Anti-Terrorism Squad for "ill-treating" sadhvi Thakur and botching the handling of the case. In response to the whole imbroglio, the Indian Agriculture Minister and NCP supremo Sharad Pawar described the BJP as "unpatriotic" when he said that "The police have started investigating...If any political party takes objection, it is unfair and unpatriotic. Why should we interfere in the process of investigations?"

The Maharashtra ATS also visited Vadodara, Gujarat, as part of their investigations into the attack. Officials of the Special Operation Group (SOG) of the Vadodara police, also a part of the investigation, said the visiting team had specific information about possible links between the Malegaon blast and city.

On 4 November, the case heated up with the arrest of serving Lieutenant Colonel Prasad Shrikant Purohit, who was sent to police custody till 15 November. A court also sanctioned a narco analysis test. In response, the Army's deputy chief, Lt. Gen SPS Dhillon, said that no one will be spared if found guilty, and that action will be taken according to the charge sheet given to them by the ATS. He added that "The arrest of Purohit has dented the image of Army."
He is alleged to have come into contact with Abhinav Bharat or Major Upadhyaya, another army man, during his postings within Nashik and Pune sometime in 2004–2005. He was found in Panchmarhi, learning Arabic, while call records between him and Upadhyaya around the time of the Malegaon blasts and beyond were said to be incriminating. It later emerged that he, along with the sadhvi, may be connected to the Samjhauta Express bombings. Indian Defence Minister A K Antony expressed serious concern over the alleged involvement of a serving Army officer in the attack, saying all necessary action would be taken against him by the Defence Ministry on the basis of the investigative report. He said: "This incident is a matter of serious concern for all of us. We are very determined to go to the root of the whole thing. We are awaiting the (Maharashtra police) report (in the case).We will take all necessary action on the basis of the report. On the part of the Army, without any hesitation, they are fully assisting and cooperating with the investigating agencies. We are waiting for a report from the Maharashtra police and I can tell you, we are taking it seriously." As the Army came under fire for allowing the civilian police service to investigate a serving officer, the army came out in strong defence of its record. Facing the possibility of reports of at least three more Army men under scrutiny, the Maharashtra government denied such allegation in going under a damage control exercise. Deputy chief minister RR Patil responded to the media allegations in saying, "Please don't malign the Army. Nor is there an intention to defame the Army." He added that it was improper to tarnish the reputation of "our Forces" because a single "bad" officer had been detected. It was claimed that the ATS jumped to a conclusion in "utter haste without ascertaining the intelligence they have collected about the tainted Army officer who belonged to [the] Intelligence Wing." The ATS counter-contended that they had sought permission from the Army Headquarters to question at least three more officers. The Defense Minister added that "We are waiting for a report, the Army will extend full cooperation. The Intelligence Bureau is investigating it." Among those who could be questioned, based on the interrogation of the retired Major Ramesh Upadhyay, was a Colonel based in Deolali and a Major. To add to the confusion reports also said Purohit had been put under a "Discipline Vigilance" ban where he would not be sacked unless a court of law finds him guilty. Purohit's remand in police custody by a magisterial court was in connection with alleged forgery in procuring a gun from the military, not with the as yet investigate terror case. His defence opposed the prosecutions' plea for a seven-day remand for further investigations, instead saying the ATS was trying to implicate him in a false case by threatening Milind Date (the alleged supplier of the gun). His counsel further alleged that Purohit, with a distinguished service record in the army, was being victimised for political reasons and that he could even be eliminated by the ATS because of the possession of intelligence data of a sensitive nature pertaining to SIMI and ISI operations, which could embarrass some quarters.

Another major and controversial breakthrough came on 14 November when the ATS arrested the Varanasi-native Dayanand Pandey, alias Sudhakar Dwivedi, who heads the Sharda Sarvagya Peeth. He was arrested in Kanpur, Uttar Pradesh, even though his exact role in the blast was not clear. The ATS then planned to go to Jammu to continue investigations of a possible wider net. It was reported that he had visited Jammu as a state guest and got into the high-security Zeesthadevi Temple near Raj Bhavan. He was apparently said to be in touch with Purohit, who led police to Pandey. Late Hemant Karkare, then chief of ATS investigating the blasts, had said: "We had got some photos, numbers and took help of UP police. He has not yet been arrested but will be if required after interrogation." In addition, another unnamed sadhvi was arrested by the Mumbai ATS from Surat on 17 October in connection to the attack.

In January 2009, Indian police were questioning Hindu Rashtra Sene chief Pramod Muthalik over his possible role in the attacks. He has reportedly been videotaped saying "The Malegaon blast is just a glimpse of what we can do" and implying the bombings were intended to counter "oppression" against Hindus.

NIA, National Investigative Agency, has found no evidence against Pragya Singh Thakur in the Sunil Joshi Murder case and it is recommending the court to drop all charges against her.

Bombay High Court granted bail to Pragya Thakur on 22 April 2017.

On December 29, 2021, a witness in the Malegaon 2008 blast case claimed that he was illegally detained for seven days by the Maharashtra Anti-Terrorism Squad (ATS) in 2008 and was pressured to name five RSS members including current Uttar Pradesh Chief Minister Yogi Adityanath.

Modasa blasts 
Union Textiles Minister, Shankersinh Vaghela, came out with an allegedly scathing attack on the Gujarat government by saying it was not willing to nab the "real" culprits behind the blast even though the Congress MP from Sabarkantha, Madhusudan Mistry, had pointed a finger at probable suspects.

He made the claim that the Gujarat Police had proved itself "useless" while it was heavily politicised in acting only on the orders issued by the Chief Minister's Office. He based this on the lack of arrests in Modesa, Gujarat, while Maharashtra police had already made arrests in the Malegaon case. With the connection to Hindu suspects in Malegaon, he said he too suspected a similar hand in these blasts. He further alleged, "This proves that terror knows no religion and that it was a matter of concern that so far it was only one-sided trend of targeting one community for suspicion and questioning."

In Gujarat, the Deputy Superintendent of Police, K.K. Mysorewala, who is heading the probe into the attack, said: "We have summoned some active ABVP members to record their statements to take our probe forward." He, however, refused to name those who have been summoned and the reason behind doing so. The Sabarkantha police have recorded statements from about 500-odd people until 28 October 2008. Mysorewala, pointed out that of the 500 people summoned for their statements 200 were associated with Hindutva organisations like the RSS, ABVP, VHP and Bajrang Dal in Modasa. However, there has still been no lead.

On 31 October, he exonerated the Malegoan accused from involvement in the Gujarat blasts. He said, "We have interrogated all the five who are currently in the custody of Mumbai police in connection with the Malegaon blast. None of them, however, are involved in the Modasa blast."

On 7 November, it was reported that clues may be emerging. The origin of a readymade Printed Circuit Board (PCB) used in the timer circuit of the bomb may yield greater clues and lead to arrests. Unlike assembled PCBs, the manufacture of a readymade PCB can be tracked with the help of its specific manufacturing design and serial number. Experts in the Physics Department of the Directorate of Forensic Sciences (DFS) in the Gujarat capital of Gandhinagar say the readymade PCB consists of two Philips Integrated Circuits (ICs), and some capacitors and resistors mounted on a circuit board in a particular order.

An expert involved with the case said that as a result of such moves "We have short-listed the names of some companies that manufacture PCBs of these types. The list had also been handed over to the Sabarkantha police and they are trying to track the final recipient of the PCB under examination. Though this can be a difficult task, it is not impossible."

See also
 List of terrorist incidents, 2008
 Saffron terror

References

External links
Batla, Delhi blasts accused urge SC to club cases, order trials in Delhi – TCN News
Special: New face of terror
Picture gallery of blast sites

21st-century mass murder in India
Western India bombings
History of Gujarat (1947–present)
2008 in India
Mass murder in 2008
Improvised explosive device bombings in India
History of Maharashtra (1947–present)
Manmohan Singh administration
Hinduism-motivated violence in India
September 2008 crimes